Robert Mangot was a French goldsmith who supplied the royal court and Mary, Queen of Scots.

He was a son of the goldsmith Pierre Mangot, who worked for Francis I of France. He was based in Paris. Mangot attended the funeral of Henry II of France as a royal goldsmith. He was listed as a goldsmith in the household of Charles IX in 1577.

In 1551 he supplied a gem of green jasper spotted with red, known as a heliotrope, engraved with the figure of an Indian.

An account for the households of the royal children in 1551 includes some of his bills. The young Mary, Queen of Scots, had jewels repaired and refashioned by Parisian jewellers including Robert Mangot, Jean Doublet and Mathurin Lussault. Mangot made gold paternoster beads and "gerbes"  for her rosaries. He provided a girdle or belt and a descending chain, made in Spanish fashion. He also supplied 1,500 gold buttons to decorate bands of silver embroidery that edged a black velvet gown.

References

External links
 Comptes des Enfants de France pour l'année 1551, BnF Gallica, MS Français 11207

16th-century French people
Court of Mary, Queen of Scots
French goldsmiths
Material culture of royal courts